The Ringer is a 1931 British crime film directed by Walter Forde and starring Patric Curwen, Esmond Knight, John Longden and Carol Goodner.
Scotland Yard detectives hunt for a dangerous criminal who has recently returned to England. The film was based on the 1925 Edgar Wallace story The Gaunt Stranger, which is the basis for his play The Ringer. Forde remade the same story in 1938 as The Gaunt Stranger. There was also a silent film of The Ringer in 1928, and a 1952 version starring Donald Wolfit.

It was made at Beaconsfield Studios in Buckinghamshire by Gainsborough Pictures in a co-production with British Lion Films. The film's sets were designed by the art director Norman G. Arnold. The author's son Bryan Edgar Wallace acted as a production manager.

Cast
 Patric Curwen as Dr. Lomond
 Esmond Knight as John Lenley
 John Longden as Inspector Wembury
 Carol Goodner as Cora Ann Milton
 Gordon Harker as Samuel Hackett
 Franklin Dyall as Maurice Meister
 Dorothy Bartlam as Mary Lenley
 Henry Hallett as Inspector Bliss
 Arthur Stratton as Sgt. Carter
 Kathleen Joyce as Gwenda Milton
 Eric Stanley as Commissioner

Critical reception
The New York Times wrote, "at the Cameo is a picturization of the late Edgar Wallace's play The Ringer. This film, which hails from England, is the sort of melodrama that provides more amusement than excitement"; while in The BFI Companion to Crime, Phil Hardy wrote, "this is the best version of this oft-filmed play...Directed by Forde with a slickness and pace unusual in British films of the period, especially considering the film's stage origins...Hokum, but enjoyable."

References

Bibliography
Wood, Linda. British Films, 1927–1939. British Film Institute, 1986.

External links

1931 films
1931 crime films
British crime films
Films directed by Walter Forde
Films based on British novels
Films based on works by Edgar Wallace
Films set in London
Gainsborough Pictures films
Films shot at Beaconsfield Studios
British black-and-white films
1930s English-language films
1930s British films
British Lion Films films